Feriz Khan or Hani i Ferizit, is known as the first place where the first inhabitants in the region Ferizaj, a city and municipality in Kosovo originated.

The first families to come to Ferizaj

Goga Families 
The city of Ferizaj was established in 1873. However, many decades before the creation of the city, Ferizaj was settled by the first family named Goga. Their houses were built in the village of Nikadin, which, before the construction of the railway, was unnamed. This family also lived in the region of Ferizaj when Elezit Khan existed. They began to work and to establish their households. Near their houses was a crossroad that linked all the roads of Kosovo. They became the most important family of that time. Members of this family are considered the first inhabitants and the creators of the city. It is thought that the Goga family originated from the area of northern Albania from the great highland in the village of Muraj. In those areas, the surname Goga is very common. Many families around the beginning of the 18th century moved to Kosovo to take advantage better living conditions. Members of Goga family brought their culture  with them to Ferizaj. Their unique and rich spoken language originated in northern Albania. The chamber of Ismajl Goga is famous for its hospitality for friends, guests, and passersby. Some of the first leaders of the Goga family were: Bislim Goga II, Haxhi Kadri Goga III, and Ismajl Goga and his descendants Muharremi, Faiku, Samiu, Kadriu, Remziu, and Xhylizarja.

Vata Families 
Early residents of Ferizaj city also included the Vata family. Families lived quietly in the same place until the year 1912. Today a military barrack occupies the land. The Vata family mostly worked in agriculture and cultivated vegetables. The first leaders of Vata family were: Ali Vata, Avdi Vata, Bajram Vata, Beqir Vata, Fejzë Vata, Haki Vata, Halim Vata, Hetem Vata, Halim Vata, Ismajl Vata, Liman Vata, Mustafë Vata, Muharrem Vata, Nazif Vata, Rizah Vata, Rifat Vata, Sylejman Vata, Shaban Vata, preacher, professor, teacher and one of the creators of the first Albanian school, called Ismajl Qemaili in Ferizaj (1914–1968).

Kurti Families 
Other early residents of Ferizaj city were the Kurti Family. Around 1750, Kolë Kurti and his brothers (Seba, Andrea, and Toni) moved to Gjakova. Later Zef Kurti married Petra from Janjevo and moved to Ferizaj in 1878 during the time the railway was under construction. They were mainly tradesmen and hand-craftsmen. One of the Kurtis was Father Shtjefën Kurti (1898–1971) who was a priest and a martyr. He was born and raised in Ferizaj and studied in Graz, Feldkirch, and Innsbruck in Austria as well as Rome, Italy. From 1936 he was the parish priest in Tirana where he was executed by the communist regime of that time.

Gjon Serreqi is another member of the Kurti family who was the leader of Lidhja Nacionale Demoratike Shqipëtare (the Albanian National Democratic Union or LNDSH). Gjon Serreqi was a professor who was jailed for his political activity and sentenced to death  by the regime of that time. Today, one of Europe's largest secondary schools bears his name in his honor.

The Kurti family brought the first pharmacist to Ferizaj, Anton Kurti, the father of Vilson and Marsel Kurti as well as the tradesman Leon Kurti, who is the father of Kolë and Franc Kurti, both mechanical engineers and gold tradesmen who to this day, reside in Ferizaj.

The Kurti family is a large family whose members also live in: Albania, Tirana, Durrës, Croatia, Opatija, Rijeka, Pula and Umag.

Albanian Catholic families 
Ferizaj became a very attractive place for those seeking new opportunities for work and it was an environment where there were no national or religious separations. Because of that, it also became attractive for Catholic families that had settle in the village since the beginning. Most of the Catholic families were involved with handcrafts. They had different experiences from visiting the most well-known handcrafts, economic, and cultural centers. The leaders of those families were: Anton Kurti, pharmacist, the father of Vilson and Marse Kurti; merchant: Leon Kurti the father of Kolë and Franc Kurti both of them mechanical engineers, and Violeta Kurti-Pufjes, education veteran; Anton Gjoni, baker and painter; Batë Kajtazi, officer, the father of Marsel and Viktor; Dedë Gjini; Dedë Pren Palaj, baker, Ded's father, teacher; Dedush Ndou, worker; Franc Dedushi, shopkeeper, Gap Gllasniqi, Merchant, Kolë Gllasniqi's father, doctor of professional orientation; Gjon Serreqi, professor, jailed for his politics and sentenced to death as a leader of Albanian National Democratic Organization for national activities.

Refugee families 

Along with the violent displacements of Albanians from Serbia (Sandžak or Niš) after the Berlin Congress in 1878, a large number of people were placed in Ferizaj. They were known as Muhaxhirs. The most well-known family leaders were Abdullah Musliu-Petrovic who was the Head of Ferizaj in 1946, Ahmet Qunglla, Ahmet Svarqa, Avdyl Rexhepi, Avdyl Qerimi, Emin Islami, Fetah Hasani, Hajdin Petrovci, etc.

Gorani families 
This family came to Ferizaj from villages around Dragaš, which were known for their professionals which included handcrafts, cooks, and confectionery makers. Heads of Gorani families were: Adem Limani, Beqir Mehmeti, Berzat Osmani, Daut Sadiku, Ejup Limani, Elez Rexhepi, etc.

Serbian and Montenegrin families 
A big number of Serbians came to Ferizaj including merchants and craftsmen. They came from different parts of Kosovo. Serbians and Montenegrins arrived between the two World Wars and settled in all of Serbias areas. The first family heads were: Duša Llukič, Marko Gjorgje Nikolič, Sava Vitković, etc.

Residents and households in Ferizaj 
The following table lists the number of residents and households economies in Ferizaj for the years 1961, 1971, 1981, and 1999. The historical population for the current area of Ferizaj is divided into statistical areas as follows:

References

Ferizaj
Demographics of Kosovo
Ferizaj